Kamoke is a city in Gujranwala District, Punjab, Pakistan. It is the 30th largest city of Pakistan. The city is the capital of Kamoke Tehsil, which is an administrative subdivision of the district and is itself subdivided into eight Union Councils. It is located on the Grand Trunk Road 21 km [13.0 mi] from Gujranwala and 44 km [27.3 mi] from Lahore.

History 

Kamoke city was settled in the era of Akbar. It was declared a tehsil in 1992 by Prime Minister Nawaz Sharif after constant persuasion by MPA CH Abdul Wakeel khan father of MPA CH Akhter Ali khan.

Administration 

Kamoke is administered by Town Municipal Administration under City District Government Gujranwala. It has Tehsil Civil Courts, its own circle of police, and a tehsil headquarters hospital.

Communication 

Kamoke is situated at the Grand Trunk (G.T.) Road, about 49 kilometres in the north from Lahore. It is almost at equal distances from Allama Iqbal International Airport Lahore and Sialkot International Airport. Kamoki is also located at the main Lahore Rawalpindi Railway Line.

Trade and Industry 

Kamoke is known for its rice, which is grown in its surrounding areas. Kamoke is also the largest rice market in the sub-continent where most kinds of rice, which include Basmati, Super Basmati, Karnal, etc. are grown, processed, and exported to the whole world.

Demographics 

The population was 152,288 in 1998. The 2017 census shows a population of 249,767, an average annual growth of 2.6% since 1998, slightly above the national average of 2.4%.

References

External links 

Google Map of Kamoke - WikiMapia Sub Maps of Kamoke

Cities and towns in Gujranwala District